Coreura euchromioides is a moth of the subfamily Arctiinae. It was described by Francis Walker in 1864. It is found in Colombia.

References

Euchromiina
Moths described in 1864